This is a list of video games published and/or developed by Cryo Interactive.

IBig Bug Bang had a limited release in France and Canada, exclusively in French language.
IICompleted posthumously.
IIIRelease for Windows and PlayStation 2 was cancelled upon demise of Cryo Interactive. After publishing rights were subsequently acquired by developer Trecision in 2003, the game got a limited independent release, albeit stripped of its Zinedine Zidane license.

References

External links
List of Cryo Interactive Entertainment games from MobyGames
Aqua Pacific games portfolio

Cryo Interactive Entertainment